National Institute may refer to:
 National Institute on Aging, United States (U.S.)
 National Institute of Food and Agriculture, U.S.
 National Institute of Mental Health, U.S.
 Belgranian National Institute, Argentina
 San Martín National Institute, Argentina
 Instituto Nacional, Chile
 Homi Bhabha National Institute, India
 Tyndall National Institute, Ireland
 Barber National Institute, U.S.

See also